Calyptocarpus is a genus of flowering plants in the family Asteraceae.

The name is derived from the Greek kalypto ("covered or hidden") and karpos ("fruit"). Species are distributed in the southern United States and Latin America.

These are perennial herbs with decumbent to prostrate stems up to 30 centimeters long. The oppositely arranged leaves have blades of various shapes with toothed edges. Flower heads are solitary in the leaf axils. Each has 3 to 8 light yellow ray florets and several yellow disc florets. The fruit is a flat cypsela with a pappus of 2 or more awns.

There are 2 to 6 species accepted in the genus.

 Species
 Calyptocarpus biaristatus - Brazil, Paraguay, Uruguay, Argentina
 Calyptocarpus burchellii  - southeastern Brazil
 Calyptocarpus vialis – straggler daisy, horseherb, hierba del caballo, lawnflower, creeping Cinderella-weed - Texas, Louisiana, Central America, Venezuela; naturalized in Taiwan, Australia, Hawaii, parts of United States
 Calyptocarpus wendlandii - Central America, southern Mexico

References

Asteraceae genera
Heliantheae